Lophocampa sobrinoides is a moth of the family Erebidae. It was described by Rothschild in 1910. It is found in Peru, Colombia, Venezuela and Ecuador.

References

 Natural History Museum Lepidoptera generic names catalog

sobrinoides
Moths described in 1910